Bałtów  is a village in Ostrowiec County, Świętokrzyskie Voivodeship, in southeastern Poland. It is the seat of the gmina (administrative district) called Gmina Bałtów.

The village has a population of 740.

History 
The village dates back to the Middle Ages and the rule of the Piast dynasty in Poland. Bałtów's first church, dedicated to Saint Andrew, probably existed in the 11th century. The famous 15th-century Polish chronicler Jan Długosz mentioned the Bałtów in his chronicles. In the early modern period Bałtów was a private village located in the Sandomierz Voivodeship of the Polish Crown. The village often changed owners, among whom the most famous were politicians Jacek Małachowski and Franciszek Ksawery Drucki-Lubecki. For a short period Bałtów was a town. It received town rights before 1751 and was deprived of them before 1790. Bałtów ceased to be a private village in 1864.

Places of interest 
 Large dinopark (called JuraPark)
 Drucki-Lubecki Palace from the 19th century
 Church of Our Lady of Sorrows dated to 1697
 Watermill from the 19th century
 A 19th-century cemetery with the chapel of the Drucki-Lubecki family
 Wooden chapel of St. John of Nepomuk

References

External links
View on Terraserver

Villages in Ostrowiec County
Sandomierz Voivodeship